Uncial 0236 (in the Gregory-Aland numbering), is a Greek-Coptic uncial manuscript of the New Testament. Paleographically it has been assigned to the 5th century.

Description 
The codex contains two small parts of the Acts of the Apostles 3:12-13,15-16, on one parchment leaf (22 cm by 18 cm). The text is written in two columns per page, 26 lines per page, in uncial letters.

Text 
The Greek text of this codex is mixed. Aland placed it in Category III.

History 
Currently it is dated by the INTF to the 5th century.

It was examined by Pasquale Orsini.

The manuscript was added to the list of the New Testament manuscripts by Kurt Aland in 1954.

Currently the codex is housed at the Pushkin Museum (Golenishev Copt. 55) in Moscow.

See also 

 List of New Testament uncials
 Coptic versions of the Bible
 Textual criticism

References

Further reading 

 Kurt Treu, Die Griechischen Handschriften des Neuen Testaments in der USSR; eine systematische Auswertung des Texthandschriften in Leningrad, Moskau, Kiev, Odessa, Tbilisi und Erevan, T & U 91 (Berlin: 1966), p. 133. 
 P. Weigandt, "Zwei griechisch-sahidische Acta-Handschriften: p. 41 und 0236", ANTF 3 (Berlin, 1969), pp. 72-95. 

Greek New Testament uncials
Greek-Coptic diglot manuscripts of the New Testament
5th-century biblical manuscripts